The discography of the Japanese rock band Chatmonchy consists of seven studio albums, two compilation album, three extended plays, twenty singles and thirty-one music videos. On 24 November 2017, Chatmonchy announced that they will be disbanding in July 2018 and their final album, Tanjō is set to be released in June 2018.

Studio albums

Compilation albums

Extended plays

Singles

Videography

Music videos

Video albums

References

External links
 Official Chatmonchy Website

Discographies of Japanese artists
Rock music group discographies